Thomas Engleheart (1745–1809), was an English sculptor and modeller in wax.

Life
Engleheart was one of the sons of Francis Engleheart of Kew, and elder brother of George Engleheart, miniature Painter to George III. He was a student at the Royal Academy, and in 1772 competed with John Flaxman for the gold medal given by the Royal Academy for a bas-relief of "Ulysses and Nausicaa". In this competition Engleheart was successful, to the bitter disappointment of Flaxman. In 1777 the Society of Arts awarded him a prize for a six-foot tall model depicting  John the Baptist in the desert. He exhibited various busts and models in wax at the Royal Academy from 1773 to 1786. Engleheart was described in a 1902 biography of his brother George as "a very religious man of enthusiastic Evangelical opinions." He died in  1809.

There are wax portraits of George III and Queen Charlotte by Engleheart in the Royal Collection; an oval medallion of Edward, Duke of Kent, modelled in red wax in 1786 is in the  collection of the National Portrait Gallery in London.

References

Sources

1745 births
1787 deaths
18th-century British sculptors
English sculptors
English male sculptors